Yingtan (531) was the sole Type 053K (NATO reporting name: Jiangdong) frigate constructed by the People's Republic of China for the People's Liberation Army Navy (PLAN). She was equipped with HQ-61 surface-to-air missiles (SAM) and the Type 381 radar, making her the first PLAN ship equipped with either surface-to-air missiles or modern air search radar.

Yingtan formally entered service in 1974, but was only named on 1 August 1986. She participated in the Johnson South Reef Skirmish in 1988. The frigate retired in 1994 and became a museum ship at the Chinese Navy Museum in Qingdao.

A sister ship was being constructed at the Qiuxin Shipyard by 1979 but was not completed.

Gallery

References

1971 ships
Type 053 frigates
Ships built in China
Museum ships in China
Frigates of the Cold War